The Huon River is a perennial river located in the south-west and south-east regions of Tasmania, Australia. At  in length, the Huon River is the fifth-longest in the state, with its course flowing east through the fertile Huon Valley and emptying into the D'Entrecasteaux Channel, before flowing into the Tasman Sea.

Location and features
The Huon River rises below Junction Hill in the Southwest National Park with much of its upper catchment drawn from the Marsden Range and associated peaks including Mount Anne, Mount Bowes and Mount Wedge. The river flows generally south through the south-eastern portion of Lake Pedder and is impounded at the Scotts Peak Dam. Thereafter, the river flows generally south-east to the Tahune Airwalk. From its source to mouth, the river is joined by 26 tributaries including the Anne, Cracroft, Picton, Weld, Arve, Russell, Little Denison and Mountain rivers.

After passing through the rural township of Glen Huon the river flows down rapids to merge with the sea water and become tidal.

Etymology
The river is named after the French Navy officer and explorer Jean-Michel Huon de Kermadec.

See also

References

Rivers of Tasmania
Huon Valley
South West Tasmania